"A Girl I Knew" is a short story by J.D. Salinger first published in February 1948 in Good Housekeeping.

Plot

The story begins as the narrator fails out of college. His father offers to send him to Europe to learn languages he could use to help his business. While in Vienna, the narrator meets a girl, Leah. She is Jewish and attempts to give him lessons in German as he introduces her to pieces of Americana. He frequently stumbles over his new language while ingratiating himself with her and her family. They both spend time in his apartment, which is above hers. Some time passes before the narrator transfers to Paris, and then goes back to college in America.

While in school he receives a letter from Leah informing him she is married. As with other letters in Salinger's works, the narrator carries it around with him for some time. News begins to spread that the Nazis have invaded Vienna, and he enlists as an infantryman. Since he is in Intelligence, he uses some of the skills acquired while studying the various languages. The story closes as he is in Vienna, after the war, and hears that Leah is dead. Presumably she was sent to Buchenwald, as the story alludes to this. The narrator finds the apartment, which is now an officer's quarters. He notices everything about it has changed and leaves abruptly.

History

The story was originally titled "Wien, Wien". Salinger was deeply resentful the title was changed by the editors of the magazine. The story was republished in Best American Short Stories 1949, ed. Martha Foley, 1949

References

1948 short stories
Short stories by J. D. Salinger
Works originally published in Good Housekeeping